Anne McLaughlin (born 8 March 1966) is a Scottish National Party (SNP) politician serving as the Member of Parliament (MP) for Glasgow North East since 2019, and previously from 2015 to 2017.

She was previously a Member of the Scottish Parliament (MSP) from 2009 to 2011. She was elected to the House of Commons at the 2015 general election but was defeated at the 2017 general election by Paul Sweeney of Scottish Labour. At the 2019 general election, McLaughlin regained the seat with a majority of 2,548 votes.

Early life and political activity
McLaughlin was born and raised in Greenock but has lived in Glasgow for many years. She attended Port Glasgow High School, graduating in 1984. She then attended the Royal Scottish Academy of Music and Drama and the University of Glasgow. She joined the SNP after the 1988 Govan by-election.

She contested Glasgow Springburn in the 2007 Scottish Parliament election, finishing second, and had previously contested the Glasgow Rutherglen seat at the 2001 UK general election (again finishing second) and the similar Glasgow Rutherglen seat at the 2003 Scottish Parliament election. She was SNP campaign co-ordinator when John Mason won the 2008 Glasgow East by-election.

Member of the Scottish Parliament: 2009–2011
McLaughlin became a regional member for Glasgow on 6 February 2009, following the death of Bashir Ahmad, as the next person on the SNP's regional list. Before this she was employed as a researcher for the MSP Bob Doris. She has championed the cause of English language skills in Glasgow school-children. She was a member of the Public Audit and Public Petitions parliamentary committees (2009–2011).

She contested the Glasgow Provan constituency in the May 2011 Scottish Parliament election but was unsuccessful.

2011 Inverclyde by-election
She was chosen by party members at a selection meeting in Greenock to contest the Inverclyde constituency in the June 2011 UK Parliament by-election. However, Labour retained the seat on a 5,835 majority - down from 14,416 - on a reduced turnout.

Member of the UK Parliament: 2015–2017, 2019–present
McLaughlin was elected to the UK Parliament in the 2015 general election, for the Glasgow North East constituency. She won the seat from the incumbent Labour MP Willie Bain on a swing of 39%, breaking the record for the biggest swing at a general election. She then however narrowly lost her seat to Labour candidate Paul Sweeney at the snap general election in 2017.

McLaughlin regained the seat from Sweeney at the snap general election in 2019 with a majority of 2,548 votes.

References

External links 
 
Profile at SNP website
;
Blogs: indygal goes to holyrood indygal in europe indygal
personal website relating to MSP position in use between 2009 and 2011

1966 births
Living people
Springburn
People from Greenock
Scottish women bloggers
Alumni of the Royal Conservatoire of Scotland
Scottish people of Irish descent
Scottish bloggers
Scottish National Party MPs
Members of the Parliament of the United Kingdom for Glasgow constituencies
UK MPs 2015–2017
UK MPs 2019–present
Scottish National Party MSPs
Members of the Scottish Parliament 2007–2011
Alumni of the University of Glasgow
Female members of the Parliament of the United Kingdom for Scottish constituencies
Female members of the Scottish Parliament